Ardencaple Farm is a settlement in Kenya's Meru County.

History 
Before the Kenyan general election in 2013, Ardencaple Farm voted as part of the Eastern Province.

References 

Populated places in Eastern Province (Kenya)